The 1986–87 FC Bayern Munich season was the 87th season in the club's history and 22nd season since promotion from Regionalliga Süd in 1965. Bayern Munich won its ninth Bundesliga title. This title marked a third consecutive championship for the club. The club reached the third round of the DFB-Pokal and finished as runner-up of the European Cup.  The Bundesliga campaign ended with only one loss with no away losses.  This feat set two Bundesliga records that were not repeated until the 2012–13 season.  This season was the final season under manager Udo Lattek.

Results

Friendlies

Casio-Cup

Bundesliga

Results by round

League standings

DFB Pokal

European Cup

1st round

2nd round

Quarter-finals

Semi-finals

Final

Team statistics

Players

Squad, appearances and goals

|-
|colspan="12"|Players sold or loaned out after the start of the season:

|}

Bookings

Transfers

In

Out

Team kits

References

FC Bayern Munich seasons
Bayern Munich
German football championship-winning seasons